Frank Joseph Gerard Dorsey (April 26, 1891 – July 13, 1949) was a member of the United States House of Representatives from Pennsylvania.

Biography
He was born in Philadelphia, Pennsylvania, April 26, 1891; attended grade and high schools; was graduated from the University of Pennsylvania at Philadelphia in 1917; served on the faculty of the University of Pennsylvania in 1916 and 1917; enlisted as a private in the Ordnance Department, United States Army, in July 1917 and was honorably discharged as a lieutenant on April 18, 1919; engaged in the manufacture of steel tools in 1919; also engaged in banking; elected as a Democrat to the Seventy-fourth and Seventy-fifth Congresses (January 3, 1935 – January 3, 1939); unsuccessful candidate for reelection in 1938 to the Seventy-sixth Congress; member of the United States Sesquicentennial Constitution Commission in 1938; director, Region III, Wage and Hours and Public Contracts Division, United States Department of Labor, from 1939 until his death in Philadelphia, Pennsylvania, July 13, 1949; interment in St. Dominic's Cemetery.

External links

1891 births
1949 deaths
Military personnel from Philadelphia
Politicians from Philadelphia
Democratic Party members of the United States House of Representatives from Pennsylvania
University of Pennsylvania alumni
University of Pennsylvania faculty
20th-century American politicians